The Whatcom Transportation Authority (WTA) is the public transit authority of Whatcom County in northwestern Washington, based in the city of Bellingham. It provides bus service on 31 fixed routes, including branded "GO Lines" with 15-minute frequencies on weekdays, to cities in its service area. In addition to bus service, the WTA offers paratransit service and a vanpool programs.

The WTA is funded by a 0.6% sales tax within the Whatcom County public transportation benefit area (PTBA) and grants from the state and federal governments. Service began on January 1, 1984, using equipment bought from the Bellingham municipal transit system after a countywide authority was established a year earlier. The WTA carried 5 million total riders on fixed bus routes in 2014, averaging out to 17,000 weekday boardings.

History

The Whatcom Transportation Authority was created in 1983 and service in western Whatcom County, including the cities of Bellingham, Ferndale and Lynden, began on January 1, 1984. The city of Bellingham began operating its own municipal transit system in 1971 by taking over a failing private operator, funding it with a 0.3% sales tax within the city beginning in 1975. The system was absorbed into the new countywide public transportation benefit area, which adopted the same sales tax rate in 1983.

Services

Bus routes

GO Lines

The "GO Lines" are four corridors where local service combines for 15-minute headways on weekdays and are branded with a specific color by the WTA beginning in 2005.

Blue Line (routes 107, 108 and 190): Bellingham Station to Sehome Village, via Western Washington University
Green Line (route 232): Bellingham Station to Cordata Station and Whatcom Community College
Gold Line (route 331): Bellingham Station to Cordata Station and Whatcom Community College, via Bellis Fair Mall and Roosevelt
Plum Line (routes 512, 525, 533 and 540): Bellingham Station to Lakeway Drive; originally added in 2008, cut in 2010, and re-instated in 2017.

A fifth GO Line, the Red Line from Bellingham Station to the Fairhaven Transportation Center, was removed in March 2017.

County Connector

WTA Route 80X, known as the County Connector, is an inter-county route operated by the WTA and Skagit Transit that makes 9 daily roundtrips on weekdays and 5 daily roundtrips on Saturdays and Sundays between Bellingham Station and Skagit Station in Mount Vernon, with intermediate stops at park and rides along Interstate 5. There is also a shuttle bus that connects Route 80X to Western Washington University with 3 weekday roundtrips.

The shuttle bus 80S also takes students from Western to Lincoln Creek Park and Ride so they can transfer to the 80X to Mount Vernon. Students can show the bus driver their student ID and board the bus for free on both WTA buses and Skagit Transit buses.

Fleet

The WTA operates a fleet of 64 full-size buses, 52 paratransit vehicles, and 35 vanpool vans. , their entire bus fleet consist of Gillig Low Floor  buses that seat 32 to 40 passengers. Eight units ordered in 2012 are diesel-electric hybrids.

References

External links

Bus transportation in Washington (state)
Transportation in Whatcom County, Washington
Transit agencies in Washington (state)